"Sugar, Sugar" is a 1969 song by The Archies, later covered by other artists

Sugar Sugar may also refer to:
Sugar Sugar, Inc, a confectionery manufacturer and retailer
Sugar, Sugar, a 2012 web game by Bart Bonte

See also
Sugar Sugar Rune, a manga (comic) and anime television series
"Suga Suga", a 2003 song by Baby Bash